Umm Muḥammad bint Ṣāliḥ was an Abbasid princess, niece of third Abbasid caliph al-Mahdi and wife of caliph Harun al-Rashid.

Ancestry
Her full name was Umm Muhammad bint Salih al-Miskin ibn Abdallah al-Mansur.

Her grandmother was a concubine Qali-al Farrashah. She was a Greek, and was the mother of Al-Mansur's son Salih al-Miskin. Her father, Salih al-Miskin was one of the youngest sons of caliph Al-Mansur.

Biography
Umm Muhammad was the wife Abbasid caliph Harun al-Rashid. He was also her half-cousin.

Umm Muhammad was the daughter of Salih al-Miskin and Umm Abdullah, the daughter of Isa ibn Ali. They married in November-December 803 in Al-Raqqah. She had been formerly been married to Ibrahim ibn al-Mahdi, who had repudiated her. 

Her first husband Ibrahim was the half-brother of Harun al-Rashid. She married him in early 780s however, just a few years later Ibrahim separated from her. After her formal divorce from her first husband, Caliph Harun al-Rashid married her.

Umm Muhammad became the second wife of Harun al-Rashid from Abbasid house. His first wife Zubaidah bint Ja'far was also an Abbasid princess and granddaughter of al-Mansur.

She spent most her life after marriage with Al-Rashid at the Caliphal palace along with al-Rashid's other wives. She died in 810s.

Family
Umm Muhammad was related to Abbasid house both paternally and maternally. She was contemporary and related to several Abbasid caliphs, prince and princesses.

References

Sources
 Al-Tabari; Hugh Kennedy (1990). The History of al-Tabari Vol. 29: Al-Mansur and al-Mahdi A.D. 763-786/A.H. 146-169
 
 

8th-century births
9th-century deaths
8th-century women from the Abbasid Caliphate
Harun al-Rashid
Wives of Abbasid caliphs
8th-century people from the Abbasid Caliphate
Arab princesses
8th-century Arabs